Diyo Sibisi (born 14 April 1982 in Sahlumbe, KwaZulu-Natal) is a South African football (soccer) striker who plays for Fico Tây Ninh in the Vietnamese First Division.

References

1982 births
South African soccer players
Living people
Free State Stars F.C. players
Mamelodi Sundowns F.C. players
Association football forwards
Cape Town Spurs F.C. players
People from KwaZulu-Natal
Maritzburg United F.C. players
University of Pretoria F.C. players
Mpumalanga Black Aces F.C. players